Swynnerton's worm lizard (Chirindia swynnertoni), also known commonly as Swynnerton's round-headed worm lizard, is a species of amphisbaenian in the family Amphisbaenidae. The species is native to eastern Africa and southern Africa.

Etymology
The specific name, swynnertoni, is in honor of British entomologist Charles Francis Massy Swynnerton.

Geographic range
C. swynnertoni is found in Mozambique, Tanzania, and Zimbabwe.

Habitat
The preferred natural habitats of C. swynnertoni are grassland and thicket.

Description
It is uniformly pale purplish pink.

Reproduction
C. swynnertoni is oviparous.

References

Further reading
Boulenger GA (1907). "Descriptions of a new Toad and a new Amphisbænid from Mashonaland". Annals and Magazine of Natural History, Seventh Series 20: 47–49. (Chirindia swynnertoni, new species, pp. 48–49).
Broadley DG, Howell KM (1991). "A check list of the reptiles of Tanzania, with synoptic keys". Syntarsus 1: 1–70. (Chirindia swynnertoni, p. 19).
Gans C (2005). "Checklist and Bibliography of the Amphisbaenia of the World". Bulletin of the American Museum of Natural History (289): 1–130. (Chirindia swynnertoni, 27).
Spawls, Stephen; Howell, Kim; Hinkel, Harald; Menegon, Michele (2018). Field Guide to East African Reptiles, Second Edition. London: Bloomsbury Natural History. 624 pp. . (Chirindia swynnertoni, p. 322).

Chirindia
Reptiles described in 1907
Taxa named by George Albert Boulenger